Charlie Elliot Wildlife Center is a nature preserve located near Mansfield, Georgia, United States. Named after Charles Newton Elliott (1906–2000), the nature preserve has  of forests, lakes, and fields, which are managed by Georgia Department of Natural Resources. The Wildlife Center includes Marben Public Fishing area, the Charlie Elliott Conference Center and Banquet Hall, Visitors' Center and Museum, and Clybel Wildlife Management Area.

Activities
The Wildlife Center offers a range of activities, including hunting, fishing, picnicking, biking trails, walking trails, horse back riding, archery range, shooting range, and educational programs.

Fishing
Marben Public Fishing Area, named after Margery and Bennet O'Boyle, is part of Charlie Elliott Wildlife Center.
The fishing area has 22 lakes and ponds. Some species of fish you may catch are Bluegill, Crappie, Largemouth Bass, Channel Catfish, and Redear Sunfish.

Hiking
Hiking is available on several trails including Granite Outcrop (1.1 miles), Clubhouse Trail (1.5 miles), Murder Creek Trail (0.9 miles), Pigeon/Green House Trail (1.0 miles).

Hunting
Clybel Wildlife Management Area is mostly forest and fields inside Charlie Elliott Wildlife Center. Game which can be hunted there include deer, turkey, and some small game animals. Management practices which are utilized to benefit multiple animal species include mowing, prescribed burning, timber harvesting, and food plot rotation.

See also

List of nature centers in the United States

References

External links
 Charlie Elliott Wildlife Center - official site at Georgia Department of Natural Resources

Parks in Georgia (U.S. state)
Museums in Newton County, Georgia
Museums in Jasper County, Georgia
Natural history museums in Georgia (U.S. state)
Sports museums in Georgia (U.S. state)
Nature centers in Georgia (U.S. state)
Protected areas of Newton County, Georgia
Protected areas of Jasper County, Georgia